The Piagnoni were a group of Christians who followed the teachings of Girolamo Savonarola. The later Piagnoni remained in the Catholic Church and kept a mixture with the teachings of Catholic dogma and the teachings of Girolamo Savonarola. The name Piagnoni (meaning weepers) was given because they wept for their sins and the sins of the world.

Beliefs 
The Piagnoni believed the message of Savonarola: that clergy need to stick to their sacramental functions, leave charitable work for the laity, Savonarola also preached against what he saw as "lax and corrupt clergy", and called for a theocratic republic and religious reform. The Piagnoni also opposed secular items deemed sinful by Girolamo Savonarola such as cosmetics, secular art and many musical instruments, which they burned in 1497.

History 
While Savonarola was still alive the Piagnoni supported the campaigns of Savonarola against illicit sex, gambling and blasphemy. Savonarola also organized bandits that persuaded the people to hand over secular items to be burned.

The Piagnoni survived underground, even after Medici rule was installed into Florence, however they gradually abandoned their goals. The Piagnoni are also linked to the presence of reformation ideas in Florence as some later Piagnoni already in 1520 praised the views of Martin Luther. Many other late followers of Savonarola were first attracted to Luther's attacks of the pope and clergy, but later had disagreements with his other theology.

Some Piagnoni converted to Protestantism, while other Piagnoni wrote against the views of Luther. Petrus Bernandinus was a follower of Savonarola and had a fanatical zeal to the teachings of Savonarola. Peter preached in Florence while Savonarola was alive and after he died. Later Peter and his companions were burned for heresy and others were expelled from Florence.

Philip Neri was a devoted follower of the teachings of Girolamo Savonarola, later he would be an influential figure in the Counter-Reformation.

References 

15th-century Christianity
Girolamo Savonarola